Ratanabon Temple is a solid Buddhist stupa in Mrauk U,  Rakhine State, Western Myanmar. The pagoda is located at the northwest corner of the Shite-thaung Temple.

According to local legends, it is said to have jewels and images enshrined in the central stupa, but none have ever been found.

It was built in 1612 by King Min Khamaung and his wife.

Photo gallery

See also
 Shite-thaung Temple
 Htukkanthein Temple
 Koe-thaung Temple
  Andaw-thein Ordination Hall
 Le-myet-hna Temple
Mrauk U
List of Temples in Mrauk U

References
Pamela Gutman (2001) Burma's Lost Kingdoms: splendours of Arakan. Bangkok: Orchid Press

1612 establishments in Asia
Buddhist temples in Rakhine State
17th-century Buddhist temples
Religious buildings and structures completed in 1612
Pagodas in Myanmar